Celeste Bradley is an American romance novelist.

Bibliography

Single novels
Fallen (2001)
A Courtesan’s Guide to Getting Your Man (2011) with Susan Donovan (rereleased as "Unbound" (2012))

The Wicked Worthingtons
When She Said I Do (2013)
And Then Comes Marriage (2013)
With This Ring (2014)
I Thee Wed (2016)
Wedded Bliss (2017)
On Bended Knee (2019)

The Liar's Club
The Pretender (2003)
The Impostor (2003)
The Spy (2004)
The Charmer (2004)
The Rogue (2005)

The Royal Four
To Wed a Scandalous Spy (2005)
Surrender to a Wicked Spy (2005)
One Night with a Spy (2006)
Seducing the Spy (2006)

The Heiress Brides
Desperately Seeking A Duke (2008)
The Duke Next Door (2008)
Duke Most Wanted (2008)

The Runaway Brides
Devil in My Bed (2009)
Rogue in My Arms (2010)
Scoundrel in My Dreams (2010)

Anthologies
My Scandalous Bride (2004) with Christina Dodd, Stephanie Laurens, and Leslie LaFoy

References

External links
Celeste Bradley official website

21st-century American novelists
American romantic fiction writers
Living people
1964 births
American women novelists
Women romantic fiction writers
21st-century American women writers